The Gate of la Latina (Spanish: Puerta de la Latina) is a gate located in Madrid, Spain. It was declared Bien de Interés Cultural in 1984.

References

External links 

Gates in Spain
Buildings and structures in Ciudad Universitaria neighborhood, Madrid
Bien de Interés Cultural landmarks in Madrid